Santiago Echeverría (born March 28, 1990) is a professional Argentine footballer. He began his career in 2008 with the Argentinian sports club Talleres.

References

External links

1990 births
Living people
Argentine footballers
Argentine people of Basque descent
Argentine Primera División players
Talleres de Remedios de Escalada footballers
Club Almirante Brown footballers
Club Atlético Brown footballers
Club Atlético Huracán footballers
Mineros de Zacatecas players
Argentine expatriate footballers
Expatriate footballers in Mexico
Association football defenders